Dereham Town Football Club is a football club based in Dereham, Norfolk, England.

History
The club was founded as Dereham Football Club in 1884, spending many of its early years in the Dereham & District League. In 1891–92 the club reached the final of the Norfolk Senior Cup, losing to CEYMS. By 1910 the club were playing in the Norwich & District League and had been renamed East Dereham. In 1920 they adopted their current name and in 1935 they joined the Norfolk & Suffolk League, which had lost several clubs to the newly established Eastern Counties League. When the Norfolk & Suffolk League merged into the Anglian Combination, the club were placed in the Senior B Division. They won the division at the first attempt and were promoted Premier Division. They were renamed Dereham Hobbies United in 1986 after a local Sunday league team merged into the club. The club were relegated from the Premier Division at the end of the 1988–89 season, but made an immediate return to the Premier Division as Division One champions. In 1991 they returned to the name Dereham Town.

In 1997–98 Dereham won the Anglian Combination Premier Division, earning promotion to Division One of the Eastern Counties League, also winning the Don Frost Memorial Cup. In 2001–02 the club finished second in Division One, beating Stanway Rovers 1–0 on the final day to overtake them and earn promotion to the Premier Division. The club won the Norfolk Senior Cup in 2006, defeating Norwich United 1–0 in the final, and again in 2007 when Wroxham were beaten 1–0 in the final. In 2012–13 they won the Eastern Counties League Premier Division, earning promotion to Division One North of the Isthmian League. The club won the Norfolk Senior Cup for the fourth time in 2015–16, defeating Norwich United 2–0 in the final. A fifth Senior Cup was won in 2018–19, when Dereham beat Thetford Town 2–1 in the final.

Reserve team
After the club were promoted to the Isthmian League, the reserve team joined Division One of the Eastern Counties League, moving up from the reserve division. They left the league at the end of the 2016–17 season.

Ground

Prior to World War II the club played at Bayfields Meadow, after which they moved to the Recreation Ground. However, the council owned the ground and there was no scope for upgrading it. In 1991, the club purchased a  site on the outskirts of the town in order to build a new £750,000 stadium.

The club moved to the new ground at Aldiss Park in December 1996. At the start of 2000–01 season Norwich City visited Aldiss Park for a pre-season friendly and although the club lost 9–0, a new record attendance of 1,800 was set. Norwich City visited for another friendly match in July 2001, with a new record of 3,000 being set.

Current squad

Honours
Eastern Counties league
Premier Division champions 2012–13
Anglian Combination
Premier Division champions 1997–98
Division One champions 1989–90
Senior Cup winners 1993–94
Norfolk Senior Cup
Winners 2005–06, 2006–07, 2010–11, 2015–16, 2018–19

Records
Best FA Cup performance: Third qualifying round, 2012–13
Best FA Trophy performance: Second qualifying round, 2014–15
Best FA Vase performance: Fifth round, 2008–09
Record attendance: 3,000 vs Norwich City, friendly match, July 2001

See also
Dereham Town F.C. players
Dereham Town F.C. managers

References

External links
Official website

 
Football clubs in Norfolk
Football clubs in England
Association football clubs established in 1884
1884 establishments in England
Norwich and District Saturday Football League
Norfolk & Suffolk League
Anglian Combination
Eastern Counties Football League
Isthmian League